CX 8 Radio Sarandí is a Uruguayan Spanish-language AM radio station that broadcasts from Montevideo.

The same group also operates CX 18 Radio Sarandí Sport.

Selected programs
 Las cosas en su sitio
 Informativo Sarandí
 Estrategia Uruguay

Notable communicators
Carlos Solé, football (1916-1975)
Eduardo J. Corso, agriculture (1920-2012)

References

External links

 
 690 AM

Spanish-language radio stations
Radio in Uruguay
Mass media in Montevideo